Denis Urubko (29 July 1973) is a Russian-Polish mountaineer. In 2009, as a citizen of Kazakhstan he became the 15th person to climb all 14 eight-thousanders and the 8th person to achieve the feat without the use of supplementary oxygen. He had Soviet citizenship, but after the dissolution of the Soviet Union he became a citizen of Kazakhstan, but renounced the citizenship in 2012. In 2013, he received Russian citizenship and on 12 February 2015 he received Polish citizenship.

Mountaineering career
In 2006, he won the Elbrus Speed Climbing competition which he did by setting a new speed record, climbing from Azau station to the summit in 3 hours, 55 minutes and 58 seconds (record was beaten in 2010 by Andrzej Bargiel). This climb represents a vertical rise of almost 3,250 metres or more than 10,600 feet and thus a speed of more than 800 vertical metres (2,600 vertical feet) an hour. He summited almost 40 minutes ahead of the next finisher. He has also won the Khan Tengri Mountain Festival when he speed climbed the mountain from Base Camp at 4,200 metres to the summit at 7,010 metres and then back to Base Camp in 12 hours and 21 minutes, winning by over 3 hours.

He has climbed two 8,000-metre peaks in winter. Makalu in 2009 together with Simone Moro and Gasherbrum II in 2011 together with Cory Richards and again Simone Moro. He has also opened new routes on Cho Oyu, Manaslu and Broad Peak. All together he has 19 ascents of 8,000-metre peaks. He is also a "Snow Leopard" having summited the five 7,000-metre peaks of the former USSR in only 42 days in 1999. He climbs without additional oxygen.

On 27 January 2018, Urubko along with Adam Bielecki - while taking part in the Krzysztof Wielicki led Polish winter expedition on K2 - led a rescue operation on Nanga Parbat to save climbers Élisabeth Revol and Tomasz Mackiewicz, who were stuck on the mountain. Bielecki and Urubko were brought to the mountain by helicopter and climbed over 1000m through the night to reach Revol. They succeeded in bringing Revol to safety, but, were unable to save Mackiewicz due to the severe weather conditions. Then he resumed the K2 expedition, but due to the unfavorable snow and weather conditions and an accident causing injury to Rafal Fronia, the team canceled the planned approach via Cesen/Basque route and reached up to 7400m on the Abruzzi Spur route. Then in an unauthorized solo attempt, Denis Urubko reported that he probably reached up to 7600m having drawn criticism from his fellow climbers.

In 2019 remarkably, on 18 July, he summited Gasherbrum II by the normal route for acclimatization for his expedition to open a new route on Gasherbrum II. After 14 days, on 1 August 2019 at 8:40 pm, he reached the summit of Gasherbrum II again via a new route without supplemental oxygen.

Eight-thousander climbs 
Urubko completed the following successful ascents of eight-thousanders:

 Everest (8848 m, without oxygen south normal route; 5/24/2000)
 Lhotse (8516 m, without oxygen normal route; 05/23/2001).
 Hidden Peak (Gasherbrum 1; 8068 m, without oxygen Japanese couloir; 08/13/2001)
 Gasherbrum II (8035 m, without oxygen normal route speed ascent: from 5800 to top in 7 hours 30 minutes, and back to 5800 in 4 hours.; 08/20/2001)
 Kangchenjunga (8586 m, classical SW-face route without oxygen; 05/13/2002)
 Shisha Pangma (main 8046 m and Central summits (8012 m) without oxygen; 10/25/2002)
 Nanga Parbat (8125 m, Kinshoffer route, without oxygen; 06/17/2003)
 Broad Peak (8046 m, normal route without oxygen; 07/18/2003)
 Annapurna I (8091 m, night ascent; 05/2004)
 Broad Peak (8046 m, SW Face first climb, with Serguey Samoilov, in alpine style; 07/25/2005)
 Manaslu (8163 m, normal route, with Serguey Samoilov; 04/25/2006)
 Manaslu (8163 m, NE face first climb, with Serguey Samoilov; 05/08/2006)
 Dhaulagiri (8167 m, normal route; 02/05/2007)
 K2 (8611 m, WW ridge, Japanese route, with Serguey Samoilov; 02/10/2007)
 Makalu (8463 m; 12/05/2008)
 Makalu (8463 m, first winter climb, with Simone Moro; 09/02/2009)
 Cho Oyu (8201 m, SE Face, first climb, alpine style, with Boris Dedeshko; 05/2009)
 Lhotse (8516 m, new route from South Col, solo from C3; 05/16/2010)
 Gasherbrum II (8035 m, first winter ascent, with Simone Moro and Cory Richards; 02/02/2011)
 Kangchenjunga (8586 m, North Face; 05/19/2014)
 Gasherbrum II (8035 m, normal route; 07/18/2019)
 Gasherbrum II (8035 m, new route solo in 24 hours from 6100 meters to summit 08/1/2019)
 Broad Peak (8046 m, solo, normal route without oxygen, 07/19/2022) 
 Gasherbrum II (8035 m, solo, normal route without oxygen, 07/25/2022)
 K2 (8611 m, solo, normal route without oxygen, 07/29/2022)

References

External links
 Painting of Denis Urubko on Makalu
 Urubko Denis in Kyrgyzstan

1973 births
Living people
Summiters of all 14 eight-thousanders
People from Nevinnomyssk
Kazakhstani people of Russian descent
Summiters of K2
Summiters of Mount Everest
Ice climbers
Russian mountain climbers
Piolet d'Or winners